Howell High School may refer to at least two different schools:

Howell High School (Howell, Michigan) in Howell, Michigan
Howell High School (New Jersey) in Farmingdale, New Jersey